Peltorhamphus is a genus of righteye flounders native to the southwest Pacific Ocean around New Zealand and Norfolk Island (Australia).

Species
There are currently four recognized species in this genus:
 Peltorhamphus kryptostomus 
Peltorhamphus latus G. D. James, 1972 (Speckled sole)
 Peltorhamphus novaezeelandiae Günther, 1862 (New Zealand sole)
 Peltorhamphus tenuis G. D. James, 1972

References

Pleuronectidae
Marine fish genera
Taxa named by Albert Günther